Voroshilovo is a rural locality (a village) in Alginsky Selsoviet, Davlekanovsky District, Bashkortostan, Russia. The population was 34 as of 2010. There is 1 street.

Geography 
Voroshilovo is located 4 km northeast of Davlekanovo (the district's administrative centre) by road.

References 

Rural localities in Davlekanovsky District